Barama may be,

Barama River, Guyana
Barama language, Gabon
Barama (Vidhan Sabha constituency)
Barama College